The Seer is the first EP by Finnish rock and metal/classical soprano Tarja. It was limited to 1,000 copies and is available only in the United Kingdom. It contains a brand new duet with Doro Pesch, remixes of tracks from My Winter Storm and live recordings. The EP was released by Spinefarm on December 1, 2008.

Track listing

References

External links
Tarja Official Website

2008 EPs
Tarja Turunen albums